Fibroblast growth factor 12 is a protein that in humans is encoded by the FGF12 gene.

The protein encoded by this gene is a member of the fibroblast growth factor (FGF) family. FGF family members possess broad mitogenic and cell survival activities, and are involved in a variety of biological processes, including embryonic development, cell growth, morphogenesis, tissue repair, tumor growth, and invasion. This growth factor lacks the N-terminal signal sequence present in most of the FGF family members, but it contains clusters of basic residues that have been demonstrated to act as a nuclear localization signal. When transfected into mammalian cells, this protein accumulated in the nucleus, but was not secreted. The specific function of this gene has not yet been determined. Two alternatively spliced transcript variants encoding distinct isoforms have been reported.

References

Further reading